The United Nations Office at Vienna (UNOV) is one of the four major office sites of the United Nations where numerous different UN agencies have a joint presence. The office complex is located in Vienna, the capital of Austria, and is part of the Vienna International Centre, a cluster of several major international organizations. UNOV was established on 1 January 1980, and was the third such complex to be created.

Constituent agencies 
Headquartered at Vienna:
International Atomic Energy Agency (has a special agreement on its status)
International Money Laundering Information Network
International Narcotics Control Board
Preparatory Commission for the Comprehensive Nuclear-Test-Ban Treaty
United Nations Commission on International Trade Law
United Nations Industrial Development Organization
United Nations Office for Outer Space Affairs
United Nations Office on Drugs and Crime

Presence at Vienna:
International Commission for the Protection of the Danube River
United Nations High Commissioner for Refugees
United Nations Information Service
United Nations Office for Project Services
Investigations Division of the United Nations Office of Internal Oversight Services
United Nations Postal Administration
United Nations Scientific Committee on the Effects of Atomic Radiation
United Nations Office for Disarmament Affairs

Visits 
Daily guided tours of the office are provided.

United Nations Library - Vienna 
The United Nations Library in Vienna provides full library and information services to staff of United Nations units based in Vienna, as well as to any Permanent Missions in Vienna and select clients.

As part of the global network of United Nations Libraries, the library works with the various United Nations libraries across the globe. The library at Vienna also works closely with the International Trade Law (UNCITRAL) Library and the United Nations Information Service (UNIS) Library.

The Library's collection includes:
 Material related to the work of the United Nations units based in Vienna
 Official United Nations documents in all official languages
 The United Nations Treaty Series
 Selected United Nations sales publications
 Documents of other United Nations organizations and specialized agencies

The Library has also developed a series of research guides on subjects related to the work of the United Nations entities based in Vienna. These guides provide more information on the work done in Vienna and highlight resources for further research in those subject areas. Some of the guides include:
 Corruption
 Crime Prevention and Criminal Justice
 Terrorism Prevention

Representatives 

 United States Ambassador to the United Nations International Organizations in Vienna
 List of ambassadors of Iran to United Nations Office at Vienna

Cultural works 

The courtyards and corridors of the United Nations Office at Vienna are adorned with many works or art.
Persian Scholar Pavilion
In June 2009 Iran donated a pavilion to the United Nations Office in Vienna, which is located in the central Memorial Plaza of the Vienna International Centre. The Persian Scholars Pavilion at UNOV features statues of four prominent Persian figures.
Highlighting Persian architectural features, the pavilion is adorned with Persian art forms and includes the statues of renowned Persian scientists Avicenna, Abu Rayhan Biruni, Zakariya Razi (Rhazes) and Omar Khayyam.

See also
United Nations headquarters (New York City)
United Nations Office at Geneva
United Nations Office at Nairobi

Notes

References

External links
United Nations Office at Vienna

Office buildings in Vienna
International organisations based in Austria
United Nations properties
Diplomatic buildings
Buildings and structures in Donaustadt
1980 establishments in Austria
Tourist attractions in Vienna
 
20th-century architecture in Austria